The Florida Film Festival, produced by Enzian Theater in Maitland, Florida, is an annual international film festival.

Overview

The Festival includes narrative and documentary features and shorts, animation, midnight movies, and educational forums, parties, and other events.

The festival has also included highly experimental new media works.

History

Past guests include Peter Falk, Susan Sarandon, Oliver Stone, Barry Levinson, Emma Stone, Paul Sorvino, Tippi Hedren, Cloris Leachman, Gabriel Byrne, Famke Janssen, Jason Lee, Christopher Walken, Dennis Hopper, Leelee Sobieski, Steve Buscemi, Campbell Scott, and William H. Macy.

Oscar qualification

A win at the festival qualifies a film for Academy Award consideration. The Seattle International Film Festival is another such qualifying festival.

See also
Film in Florida
Florida Film Critics Circle

References

External links
 Enzian Theatre
 Florida Film Festival

Film festivals in Florida
Cinema of Florida
Festivals in Orlando, Florida
Tourist attractions in Orange County, Florida
Maitland, Florida
Year of establishment missing
Film festivals established in 1991
1991 establishments in Florida